State Highway 136 (SH 136) is a Texas state highway that runs from the Texas–Oklahoma border south of Guymon, Oklahoma to Amarillo. The route was designated on January 23, 1929 from Amarillo to Oklahoma. On March 19, 1930, the route was truncated to Stinnett, with the portion north of Stinnett transferred to SH 117. On February 4, 1941, the section of SH 136 from the Moore/Potter County Line to Stinnett was cancelled. On September 22, 1942, the route was extended east to Borger.  The highway was extended to the Oklahoma border on November 21, 1963, replacing most of FM 278 and all of FM 2216.

Junction list

References

136
Transportation in Potter County, Texas
Transportation in Moore County, Texas
Transportation in Hutchinson County, Texas
Transportation in Hansford County, Texas